Philip Varone (born December 4, 1990) is a Canadian professional ice hockey forward who is currently playing with HC Spartak Moscow in the Kontinental Hockey League (KHL). Varone was selected by the San Jose Sharks in the fifth round (147th overall) of the 2009 NHL Entry Draft.

Playing career

Amateur
Varone played major junior hockey in the Ontario Hockey League (OHL) from 2006–07 to 2010–11, collecting 78 goals and 152 assists for 230 points in 228 games.

Professional
Varone attended the San Jose Sharks training camp in 2010, but was sent down to London for the season. By July 2011, the Sharks had not signed Varone to a contract, making him a free agent. Varone attended the Buffalo Sabres training camp in 2011, but did not make the team. He instead signed a one-year AHL contract with the Sabres' affiliate Rochester Americans of the American Hockey League (AHL). He led Rochester in scoring with 11 goals and 41 assists.

On March 19, 2012, the Buffalo Sabres signed Varone to a three-year entry level contract. Varone was recalled to the Sabres' active roster on January 22, 2014, and scored his first career point with an assist on a goal by Brian Flynn the next night against the Carolina Hurricanes. Varone scored his first goal in his fourth career game, against Braden Holtby of the Washington Capitals on January 28, 2014.

Following the 2014–15 season, Varone became a restricted free agent under the NHL Collective Bargaining Agreement. The Buffalo Sabres made him a qualifying offer to retain his NHL rights and, on July 5, 2015, Varone filed for salary arbitration. The two sides reached an agreement on a one-year, two-way contract on July 13.

In the 2015–16 season, Varone played in a further five games with the Sabres, but was on assignment with the Rochester Americans when on February 27, 2016, he was traded to the Ottawa Senators as part of a seven-player deal. Varone was called up to Ottawa for the final game of the season, April 9, 2016 and recorded an assist. In the following 2016–17 season, Varone split between Ottawa and their American Hockey League affiliate, the Binghamton Senators. Serving as an alternate captain he appeared in 65 regular season games for Binghamton, where he recorded 36 assists and 51 points. He was scoreless over 7 games in the NHL with Ottawa.

On July 1, 2017, having left the Senators as a free agent, Varone signed a two-year, two-way contract with the Philadelphia Flyers. At the end of the 2017–18 regular season, Varone was named the AHL's Most Valuable Player.

On December 7, 2018, Varone was recalled by the Flyers. He made his Flyers debut on December 8 against the Buffalo Sabres. He scored his first goal as a member of the Flyers on December 22 in a 4–3 loss to the Columbus Blue Jackets.

As a free agent Varone left the Flyers to sign a one-year, two-way contract with the Montreal Canadiens on July 3, 2019. Assigned to AHL affiliate, the Laval Rocket, to begin the 2019–20 season, Varone although limited through injury contributed with 14 points in 27 games. On February 20, 2020, Varone was traded by the Canadiens along with Riley Barber to the Pittsburgh Penguins in exchange for Joseph Blandisi and Jake Lucchini. He was immediately assigned to join affiliate, the Wilkes-Barre/Scranton Penguins. Varone registered 5 assists in just 6 games before the remainder of the season was cancelled due to the COVID-19 pandemic.

With the following North American season delayed due to the pandemic, Varone as a free agent opted to sign abroad for the first time in his career, joining Kazahstani based club, Barys Nur-Sultan of the KHL on October 26, 2020.

On July 7, 2021, Varone joined Lausanne HC of the National League (NL) on a one-year deal. On November 17, 2021, Varone was shipped to SC Bern for the remainder of his contract.

As a free agent from Bern, Varone returned to the KHL in agreeing to a one-year deal with HC Spartak Moscow on July 21, 2022.

Career statistics

References

External links

1990 births
Living people
Barys Nur-Sultan players
SC Bern players
Binghamton Senators players
Buffalo Sabres players
Canadian ice hockey centres
Erie Otters players
Ice hockey people from Ontario
Kitchener Rangers players
Lausanne HC players
Laval Rocket players
Lehigh Valley Phantoms players
London Knights players
Ottawa Senators players
People from Vaughan
Philadelphia Flyers players
Rochester Americans players
San Jose Sharks draft picks
HC Spartak Moscow players
Wilkes-Barre/Scranton Penguins players